The 2014–15 Nemzeti Bajnokság I is the 70th season of the Nemzeti Bajnokság I, Hungary's premier Volleyball league.

Team information 

The following 12 clubs compete in the NB I during the 2014–15 season:

Regular season

Standings

Championship playoff 
Teams in bold won the playoff series. Numbers to the left of each team indicate the team's original playoff seeding. Numbers to the right indicate the score of each playoff game.

Final standing

External links
 Hungarian Volleyball Federaration 

Nemzeti Bajnoksag
Nemzeti Bajnoksag